The Eighteenth Amendment may refer to:

Eighteenth Amendment to the United States Constitution, which established Prohibition
Eighteenth Amendment of the Constitution of Ireland, which permitted the state to ratify the Amsterdam Treaty
Eighteenth Amendment to the Constitution of Pakistan, which reduced the powers of the President of Pakistan
Homer vs. the Eighteenth Amendment, an episode of the television series The Simpsons